Club Deportivo Irapuato is a professional football club, based in Irapuato, Guanajuato, Mexico. They are currently playing in the Serie A in the Liga Premier.

Irapuato has mostly played in the Promotion League of Mexico (formerly Primera División A or Ascenso MX. From 2000 to 2004, the team briefly rose to prominence in the Liga MX reaching the playoffs. Historically, Irapuato has spent over 26 years in the Primera División, never quite excelling to challenge for the title.

The team was relegated from the Primera División in 2004 but not because of their on-field performance, but because of financial irregularities. In 2013, the team then took a turn for the worse being relegated to Liga Premier, the Third Division of Mexico for a year.

The team briefly returned to Ascenso MX in May 2014 when Ballenas Galeana, decided to move to Irapuato, and also change their name to Club Irapuato, once again giving Irapuato a football team.
But that team was relegated too after a couple of mediocre seasons to Liga Premier, were they play to this day.

History

The club dates back to 1910 in the city of Irapuato where a club was founded under the name Club Mutualista Irapuatense by Pedro Garnu and by Diego Mosqueda who was an important person in the sports development in the city, and would later go on to establish the club's rival Club León in the 1920s. In its first years many clubs were formed in order to create a futbol league in Guanajuato Deportivo Irapuato, Internacional, Club Marte, ISCO and Club León inaugurated the league in 1925.

The first tournament was won by Club Marte because the tournament was not finished due to problems between Irapuato and ISCO. In 1928 the club reached the final and played it against Deportivo Internacional; the club's squad was made up by Kurt Lenk as keeper Antonio Aguilar and José Núñez playing defender Julián Ramírez, Francisco Belman and Salvador Silva in the mid field and Antonio "El Gato" Baltazar, Crisoforo Juárez, Secundino Alvarado, Teofilo and Juan Aguilera playing as forwards. The club came out with a 1–0 victory, winning its first league title. This club wore a white shirt with black shorts and socks.

The club that plays today under the name Club Deportivo Irapuato was founded in 1948 where it had trouble staying in the league. in the late 1940s there were various clubs that represented the city of Irapuato and it was until 1948 when they decide to merge in order to become more competitive and so they did and join the Second division in 1949. The men in charge of the merge were  Oscar Bonfiglio and Jesús Vaca Gaona both had participated in the 1928 Olympic games in Amsterdam. The club would once again change its name this time to Club Deportivo Irapuato A.C which many people believe to be the date when the club was established.

México Primera División

The club was one of the first clubs to inaugurate the Segunda División de México in the 1949–50 tournament where after 3 seasons the club won its first promotion. The club made its Primera División debut in the league on 22 August 1954 against Zacatepec who they beat 4–5. In the second round the club played at home in the Estadio Revolución stadium against Puebla FC who they also defeated 4–0. The club also revived its rivalry which had stopped in the late 1930s against Club Leon, that game ended in a 1–1 draw. The club's best tournament was the 1963–64 Mexican Primera División season where the club finished 4th with 32 points; Guadalajara finished with 33 points.

Relegation
In the 1971-72 season the club found itself playing in group 2 with clubs Monterrey, Guadalajara, Puebla, Atlante, Pachuca, Pumas, Toluca and Torreón. At the end of the tournament the club finished last and had to play a relegation series against the other last place teams. The series was played against Torreón, Atlético Español, and Veracruz. the first match was played against Veracruz who defeated them 3–1 the first leg, the second leg ended in a 0–0 draw. The last game was played against Torreón in the Estadio Jalisco where Irapuato lost 1–0 and were relegated for the first time in 18 years to the second division .

Second Division
Back in the Segunda División the club became a top club reaching the final in its first year back against Petroleros de Ciudad Madero. The first game was played in Irapuato which they won 1–0. It seemed the club would clinch its promotion having the second match at home but surprisingly Ciudad Madero came out with a 2–0 victory and so earning its promotion.

In the 1974–75 season, the club had its second opportunity when they once again reached the final this time playing against Tecos. The club would lose that final match 1–0. It took place in the Estadio Azteca in Mexico City.

The club would get a third opportunity to earn a promotion in 1978; this time against Zacatepec. This time a series was played. The first match ended in a 1–0 victory for Zacatepec. The second match ended in a 4–1 victory for Zacatepec and so the club would lose its third promotion series in 6 years.

Second promotion
In the 1980s the club had a streak of qualifying to the quarterfinals but not been able to reach the final. After four years the club finally reached the final in the 1984-85 tournament under the management of Diego Malta Solano against Pachuca . The first match was played in Irapuato where they took a 2–1 advantage. in the return match Irapuato came out with a win and finally earn the promotion after 13 years. Notable players from that club were Anselmo Romero, Rafael Lira, Jesús Montes, Eugenio Constantino and Teodoro Orozco.

Second relegation
In the 1990-91 season Irapuato got relegated to the second division for the second time. in 1994 Irapuato joined the newly formed Primera Division A and got the opportunity to return to the Primera División.

1999–00 Promotion
In the Invierno 99 season Irapuato faced Zacatepec in the Final, they beat them 3–1 in the first leg with goals from Cristián Ariel Morales, and Martín Rodríguez in the second leg things got complicated when Zacatepec tied the game but Morales and Rodriguez scored and they took the championship with an overall score of 5–3.

In the Verano 00 season the champion Irapuato made it to the Final again this time facing Cruz Azul Hidalgo if Irapuato would win they would be promoted to the Primera División, the first leg was played in Hidalgo and the score was 2–2 Martín Rodríguez and Jesús Gutiérrez scored the two goals for Irapuato. The second leg and Promotional Final was played in The Sergio León Chávez on 10 June 2000. The final score was 2–2 Cristián Morales and Martín Rodríguez scored for Irapuato, Alejandro Corona and James Owusu-Ansah scored for Cruz Azul Hidalgo. In extra time no one scored so they went to penalties, Cruz Azul Hidalgo's Pedro Resendiz, Josef Nemec, scored the penalties but Erik Marín, and Mario Ramírez missed. However Irapuato's Martín Rodríguez, Cristián Morales, Víctor Saavedra and Héctor Gómez scored the penalties the final score was 4–2 in penalties. Irapuato would return to the Primera División almost a decade after being relegated in 1991.

First disappearance
Suddenly on 26 December 2001 Grupo Pegaso announces Irapuato was sold to Veracruz for its spot in the Primera División and Irapuato was left without a team for the Verano 2002 season. And in the Invierno 2002 season or Apertura 2002 as it was now called, Querétaro a Second Division team moved to Irapuato under the name Real Irapuato. In their first season they made it to the final versus C.F. La Piedad and eventually win the Apertura 2002 championship in penalties.

First Reappearance
For the Apertura 2002, Querétaro F.C. from the Primera Division A transferred to Irapuato when La Piedad dissolved in the Primera Division.

2002–03 Promotion
In the 2003 season Irapuato makes it to the 2002-03 promotional final against Clausura 2003 champions and arch rivals Club Leon. The first leg was played on 18 June 2003 Irapuato won the Clasico del Bajio and the first game in Leon's home 2–1 with a goal from Ariel González and an own goal from Gorsd, the second leg was played in Irapuato and in the last moments of the game Josias Ferreira scores a goal ending the game 1–0 and returning Irapuato to the Primera División.

Second disappearance
After Clausura 2004, Irapuato with 6 wins, 8 ties and 5 losses with a total of 26 points. They announced the club was relocated to Colima. But the federation reduced the league from 20 to 18 teams, Irapuato join Querétaro to dissolved their teams.

Second reappearance and third relegation
Irapuato was the city without a soccer team for 1 year, but Mérida F.C. from the Segunda Division transferred to Irapuato for the Apertura 2005. After Clausura
2006 was playing for survival to stay in the league, but they relegated to Tercera Division after losing in a playoff against Delfines de Coatzacoalcos.

Return to Liga de Ascenso
Apertura 2008: Promoted from Segunda Division from Pachuca Juniors and renamed "Club Irapuato Por Siempre". They made all the way to the Final but lost to Querétaro on the road after tied 0–0 at their home turf.
Clausura 2009: Bad Torneo, with 20 points (17th overall and 4th in Group 2).
Apertura 2009: Changed format to one full standings from 3 groups from the federation and reduced the teams to 17. Clinched Homefield and 1st round bye with a first-place finish of a total of 32 points. They made all the way to the Final for the 2nd Time in 3 Torneos but lost to Necaxa in extra time at home after losses 1–0 on the road in the first leg.
Bicentenario 2010: They maintain their roster but finished 11th with 20 points.
Apertura 2010: Increased the teams to 18. They brought Cuauhtémoc Blanco to Irapauto for 1.5 seasons.  They made all the way to the Final for the 3rd Time in 5 Torneos but lost to Veracruz (the top seed in the playoffs) in full-time on the road after tied 1–1 at their home turf in the first leg with their 26 points and finished in the top 4.

Clausura 2011 Champions
In the Clausura 2011 Season, Irapuato was crowned Champion by defeating Tijuana in the final with a score of 2–1. The First Leg was played in Tijuana and it ended in a 1–1 draw goals were scored by Luis Alberto Valdez at 8' for Irapuato, and Alejandro Molina at 60' for Tijuana. The Second Leg was played in Irapuato and ended in a 1–0 win for Irapuato crowning them as Champions of the 2011 Clausura, the goal was scored by José Cruz Gutiérrez in the 85' minute of the game.

Squad
  1 Adrián Martínez
  2 Margarito González
  8 Jorge Manrique
  10 Cuauhtémoc Blanco
  11 Ariel González 
  13 Gandhi Vega
  16 Arturo Alvarado
  18 Esteban Alberto González 
  21 José Luis López 
  27 Gerardo Gomez
  44 Juan Carlos Arellano
Substitutes
  6 Francisco Razo 
  7 Alejandro Castillo
  45 José Cruz Gutiérrez 
  23 Javier Saavedra
  28 Luis Alberto Valdés
  29 José Guadalupe Martínez
  58 Efraín Cruz 
  5 Ezequiel Brítez

2011 Promotional Final

1st Leg
After being crowned Champions of the Clausura 2011 season. Irapuato faced Tijuana the Apertura 2010 Champions again, for a spot in the Primera División.
The First leg of the Promotional final was played at Irapuato on Wednesday 18 May 2011 4 days after winning the championship at home. Irapuato Were highly motivated to return to the Primera División after 7 years of absence, Tijuana on the other hand had never had Primera División experience. The 1st leg of the final was tied in a scoreless tie between the two teams.

2nd Leg
3 days after the first match in Irapuato, the second leg of the Promotional final was played in Tijuana's Estadio Caliente stadium. Tijuana made several changes to their starting 11 players, replacing defender Miguel Almazán with a forward, and changing their formation from a 5-4-1 formation to a more attacking 4-2-2 formation. Irapuato made drastic changes as well; they changed to a 5-3-2 formation fortifying their defense with 5 players. During the Match Tijuana had various chances for goal and the first goal came from young prospect Joe Corona scoring a header in the first half. 3 minutes later Mauro Gerk scored. 5 minute after the second goal Irapuato scored after Alejandro Molina from Tijuana accidentally pushed the ball into the net from a free kick done by José Cruz Gutiérrez. The game ended in a 2–1 win for Tijuana. Tijuana got promoted to the Primera División while Irapuato remained in the Second Division.

After Promotional Final
Apertura 2011: The league reduced the teams to 16. Cuauhtémoc Blanco didn't play some games due to injury, but they still finished in 5th place. However, they were eliminated in the Quarterfinals by their rivals Leon.
Clausura 2012: The league reduced the teams once again to 15 teams. Cuauhtémoc Blanco was released from the team due to injury issues and a bad season. They earned 14 points and finished in 12th place after they didn't win in their final 5 games.
Apertura 2012: They have their worst season, with 16 points. They finished in 12th place after they didn't win in their last 5 games. When the season was over, the federation was owed 3 million for Cuauhtémoc Blanco. On 15 December, they had a 65% chance of being dissolved. The team was relocated to Morelos and renamed Zacatepec beginning next season.

Third Disappearance and Played in Segunda Division
After Clausura 2013, Irapuato finished in the bottom 5 of the standings and the team was moved to Zacatepec, Morelos and were rebranded to Zacatepec 1948. Union de Curtidores was rumored to be moving into the city of Irapuato to replace the dissolved franchise there, but the owner of Union decided to keep the team in Leon after getting approval to play their home games in Estadio Nou Camp. However, some time after a franchise from Querétaro FC was purchased to the team was revived in Segunda Division de Mexico playing in the Liga Premier for the Apertura 2013.

The franchise came to join the Copa de la Liga Premier de Ascenso Apertura 2013, where they reached the final against Cruz Azul Jasso and lost 1–0 on aggregate, so Irapuato was runner-up. At the end of the tournament the franchise returned to Querétaro, because of the restructuring that occurred in Grupo Delfines, which decided that the team that played in the Apertura 2013 at Estadio Sergio León Chávez as Irapuato, would return to their roots to play either at Estadio Corregidora or La Cañada.

Return to Ascenso MX and Third Reappearance
On 29 May 2014, Enrique Bonilla, Sports CEO of Ascenso MX unveiled the emergence of Irapuato, instead of Ballenas Galeana, who had to relocate because of their economic problems, same which were resolved by guanajuatenses entrepreneurs which in turn called for the team to move to their state. Furthermore, circulated a letter from the President of the Civil Association Club Irapuato, J. Concepcion Director and Enrique Enriquez Bonilla, secretary general of Ascenso MX, where the AC are declared owners of the brand name and badge Irapuato equipment. Ballenas Morelos was sold and moved to Irapuato and named Club Irapuato.

Fourth Disappearance and Returns to Liga Premier
On 7 June 2015, Irapuato was officially relocated from Irapauto to Los Mochis, Sinaloa and renamed to Murcielagos Los Mochis. They are now playing in the Segunda Division de Mexico after playing one season in the Ascenso MX.

From 2015, Irapuato reached three consecutive finals, losing all. Apertura 2016 and Clausura 2017 against Tlaxcala F.C. and Apertura 2017 against Club Tepatitlán.

Atlético Irapuato
On 17 June 2019. The team was renamed as Atlético Irapuato, but maintained the same shield design, colors and identity.

Club Deportivo Irapuato 
On 30 July 2020, the club was renamed Club Deportivo Irapuato after Grupo Temachalco took possession of the franchise. At the end of the season, the team won its third Second Division championship after defeating Cruz Azul Hidalgo 1–3 on the aggregate scoreboard.

At first it was reported that Irapuato was promoted after the Liga Premier championship. However, on 3 June 2021, the Mexican Football Federation announced the opening of a selection process to choose the club that would occupy the Liga Premier 3 place, because Irapuato must still meet some requirements to compete in the Liga de Expansión MX, three Liga Premier clubs were chosen for an audit process that would determine the winner of the promotion. On 5 July 2021, it was confirmed that no team undergoing the certification audit approved the procedure, so there will be no club promoted from the Liga Premier, for this reason the promotion of Irapuato was frustrated by administrative issues of the club and regulations of the league.

Therefore, the club announced that it would continue to participate in Serie A and began a process to form a new roster of players, however, at the end of August 2021 Grupo Tecamachalco transferred the franchise to local businessmen to ensure its continuity and avoid promotion problems for the club, this after Fernando San Román, CEO of Tecamachalco, was sanctioned by Femexfut and the company decided to seek the purchase of a football team in Costa Rica.

However, at the end of August 2021, the Irapuato city council denied the use of the Estadio Sergio León Chávez to the club due to breach of the agreement signed between the team and the government, since a clause of the agreement stipulated that the team should be promoted to the Liga de Expansión MX for the 2021–22 season, something that could not be fulfilled. After this fact, the new board sought to establish the team in a city near Irapuato while the city council negotiated with the owners of Alebrijes de Oaxaca for the arrival of a new franchise that would continue the football in the city. Finally, neither the club nor the city council managed to close the negotiations, so on 10 September it was announced that the team went into hiatus, so it does not dispute any competition during the season.

Historic Badges

Stadium

Irapuato FC play their home matches at Estadio Irapuato founded on 23 March 1969 under the name "Estadio Irapuato" renamed Estadio Sergio Leon Chavez in 1990. Irapuato played their first home matches at Estadio Revolucion. On 27 October 1968 the board of Irapuato invited the Spanish Olympic football team that competed at the 1968 Olympics to play a friendly match against Irapuato, the stadium recorded a large entry in that game the Spanish beat Irapuato.

The first goal was scored by the captain of Spain Juan Manuel Asensi and Marco Antonio Sanchez Moya of Irapuato tied the score. 23 March 1969 was the official opening. in 1970 the Mexico National Team played vs Irapuato at that time Mexico was being prepared for the 1970 FIFA World Cup, The Mexico national team came out victorious with a score of 4–1.

The stadium has hosted two international football tournaments, the 1983 FIFA World Youth Championship and the 1986 FIFA World Cup.

Season to season

29 seasons in Primera División
48 seasons in Second Division
18 seasons in Third Division

League Goal scoring Champions

Nickname
The nickname "Trinca Fresera", which means "Strawberry Lashers", originates from the year 1949, when the team got an invitation to Play teams such as La Piedad, Leon, and the Brazilian Team Vasco da Gama. The Games would Take Place in The Estadio de la Ciudad de Los Deportes now known as Estadio Azul in Mexico City.
Vasco da Gama had a very good Offence, in that time it was known as "la trinca infernal" the term trinca, utilized in that time as a reference for 3, trinca infernal referenced Vasco da Gama's Offence which had 3 very agile, quick men.
Don Agustín González Escopeta, Master of the Sport Commentary, Watched the Match between Irapuato and La Piedad, chronically the Leon vs Vasco match was on and He said: "si el Vasco da Gama es una trinca infernal, el Irapuato es la trinca fresera" ¡que bonito juegan!, which meant "If Vasco da Gama are the Infernal Lashers then Irapuato are the Strawberry Lashers ¡boy they play nice!" .
It was then that don Agustín González Escopeta, Baptized Irapuato as la trinca fresera, To this date in any Stadium they enter the fans identify them as la trinca fresera del Irapuato.

Shirt Sponsors and Manufacturers 
 Championship jerseys*

Managers

Supporters
Irapuato FC Official Supporter group are Los Hijos de la Mermelada which translates to The Children of the Jam in English

Rivalries

El Clásico del Bajio
Irapuato vs. Leon

Irapuato's most fierce rivalry according to the fans is against León, named after both of the teams region "Clásico del Bajio".

El Clásico
Irapuato vs. Celaya

Irapuato Also have other Rivals Such As Celaya and Salamanca both teams in Guanajuato.

Personnel

Coaching staff

Players

First-team squad

Notable players
For all Irapuato players with a Wikipedia article see :Category:Club Irapuato players.

Argentina
  Cristián Ariel Morales
  Ariel González
  Alejandro Sabella
  Antonio Mohamed
  Carlos Alberto Etcheverry
  Jorge Luis Gabrich
  Marcelo Espina
  Arnaldo Sialle
  Ezequiel Brítez
  Roberto Nicolás Saucedo
Brazil
  Marcelo de Faria
Chile
  Juvenal Olmos
  Reinaldo Navia
Colombia
  Neider Morantes
Costa Rica
  Rónald Gómez
  Óscar Emilio Rojas
  José Luis Soto
  Mauricio Solís
Ecuador
  Édison Méndez

Honduras
  Ninrrol Medina
Jamaica
  Peter Isaacs
Japan
  Kenji Fukuda
Mexico
  Jorge Manrique
  Jaime Belmonte
  Cuauhtémoc Blanco
  Isaac Terrazas
  Fernando Arce
  Samuel Máñez 	
  Teodoro Orozco
  José Luis López
  Francisco Rotllán
  Adrián Martínez
  Mario Méndez
  Juan de Dios Ramírez Perales
  Rafael Márquez Esqueda
  Felipe Zetter
  Ligorio López
  Paulo Cesar Chávez
  José Cruz Gutiérrez
  Alfonso Blanco
  José Joel González
  Felipe Quintero

Paraguay
  Aldo Adorno
  Denis Caniza
  Lorenzo Calonga
  Aureliano Torres
Peru
  Germán Carty
United States
  Yari Allnutt
Uruguay
  Martín Rodríguez Alba
  Gonzalo Pizzichillo
  Álvaro Pintos
  Carlos Miloc
Zambia
  Kalusha Bwalya

Honours

Professional
Ascenso MX: (4)
Champion : Invierno 1999, Verano 2000, Apertura 2002, Clausura 2011.
Runner-up (2): Apertura 2008, Apertura 2009

Campeón de Ascenso: (2)
Champion : 2000, 2003

Segunda División: (3)
Champion : 1953–54, 1984–85, 2020–21

Copa México: (0)
Runner-up (1): 1955-56

 Copa Mexico Segunda División (2)
Champion : 1953, 1954

Amateur
 Canpeonato Liga Mayor del Centro (11)
Champion : 1942, 1943, 1944, 1946, 1947, 1948, 1950, 1951, 1952, 1953, 1954

 Campeonato Estatal de Futbol (7)
Champion : 1919, 1924, 1925, 1931, 1933, 1936, 1938

 Campeonato Federacion Nacional de Futbol (4)
Champion : 1931, 1936, 1938, 1942

 Campeonato FMF para Asociaciones Afiliadas (3)
Champion : 1943, 1946, 1959

 Liga Amateur de Guanajuato (1)
Champion : 1928

Friendlies
 Copa de Oro de Occidente (4)
Champion : 1957, 1959.

References

External links

Club Irapuato Official Twitter 
Club Irapuato Official Facebook
Club Irapuato on YouTube
Unofficial Website
Official supporter club site

 
Football clubs in Guanajuato
Liga Premier de México
1911 establishments in Mexico
Football club
Association football clubs established in 1911